Mparo may refer to one of the following:

 Mparo, Rukiga, a town, the headquarters of Rikiga District, Western Region, Uganda
 Mparo, Hoima, a village, the location of the Bunyoro Kingdom royal tombs.